The Hussy is a 1979 French drama film directed by Jacques Doillon. It was entered into the 1979 Cannes Film Festival, where Doillon won the Young Cinema Award. In July 2021, the film was shown in the Cannes Classics section at the 2021 Cannes Film Festival.

Plot
François a misfit kidnaps Mado, an odd 11-year old, and a story of Stockholm syndrome forms in the attic where Mado is locked.

Cast
 Claude Hébert - François
 Madeleine Desdevises - Mado
 Paulette Lahaye - La mère de Mado
 Juliette Le Cauchoix - La mère de François
 Fernand Decaean - Le beau-père de François
 Dominique Besnehard - L'instituteur
 Odette Maestrini - L'epicière
 Ginette Mazure - La photographe
 Denise Garnier - La secrétaire de Mairie
 Norbert Delozier - Le beau-frère de François
 Janine Huet - La soeur de François
 Marie Sanson - La vieille dame aux Cailloux
 Edouard Besnehard - Le boulanger
 Henriette Adam - Une femme
 Jean Brunelière - Le juge d'instruction
 Jacques Thieulle - L'avocat
 Christian Bouillette - Un gendarme

References

External links

1979 drama films
1979 films
Films directed by Jacques Doillon
French drama films
1970s French-language films
1970s French films